Maud Megens (born 6 February 1996) is a Dutch water polo player.

She was part of the Dutch team winning the silver medal at the 2015 World Aquatics Championships, where she played in the driver position. She is the daughter of former water polo players Hein Megens and Patricia Libregts. Her grandfather is Thijs Libregts.

College career
She plays for University of Southern California. 2018 NCAA winner.

See also
 List of World Aquatics Championships medalists in water polo

References

External links
 

1996 births
Living people
Dutch female water polo players
Sportspeople from Rotterdam
World Aquatics Championships medalists in water polo
Water polo players at the 2020 Summer Olympics
Olympic water polo players of the Netherlands
20th-century Dutch women
21st-century Dutch women